Cap Gris-Nez (literally "cape grey nose") is a cape on the Côte d'Opale in the Pas-de-Calais département in northern France.

The 'Cliffs of the Cape' is the closest point of France to England –  from their English counterparts at Dover.

Etymology 
Gris-nez literally means "grey nose" in English. It is derived from colloquial Dutch "grey cape"; officially, the Dutch name was Swartenesse ("black cape") to set it apart from Blankenesse "white cape" (Cap Blanc-Nez) to the northeast. The element -nesse is cognate to English -ness, denoting "headland", as in for example Dungeness or Sheerness.

Geology

The cliffs of Cap Gris-Nez are made of sandstone, clay and chalk. They are mainly grey, which gives the cape its name. It is also a popular place to collect fossils, which are mainly from the Jurassic period. Common fossils include bivalves, gastropods and wood. In the sandstone layers with small pebbles, one can find teeth of fish and reptiles. Sometimes, larger ammonites are found in the sandstones.

The cape is a regular stopover for millions of migratory birds.

History
The proximity of the cape to England led to the frequent destruction of the nearby village of Audinghen in wars between England and France. On the top of the cliff are the ruins of an English fortress, built by Henry VIII at the beginning of the 16th century. The English called the fort 'Blackness', a translation of the Dutch name Swartenisse.

Napoleonic Wars 
Napoleon stopped at the cape on 1 July 1803, whilst making an inspection of the coast around Boulogne-sur-Mer and of his invasion troops. He then envisioned setting up a cross-Channel optical telegraph, with a semaphore on the cape. The first semaphore of this line was installed on the cape in 1805, without waiting for the planned French invasion of England.  On 18 July 1805, a naval battle took place off the cape.  A British flotilla with strong numerical superiority pursued Dutch ships that were following the coast and trying to get into the harbour at Ambleteuse. Expecting an attack of this type, Napoleon had stationed a battery of 300 guns on the cape, and a barrage from this force obliged the British vessels to withdraw.

World War II 
Gabriel Auguste Ferdinand Ducuing and his men died on May 25, 1940, while defending the semaphore, and a commemorative stela was later placed on the cape to commemorate this sacrifice.

Later, the Germans built a blockhouse inside the Tudor ruins. The locality has a cluster of World War II bunkers, part of the Atlantic Wall intended to rebuff the anticipated allied invasion. There are heavy artillery sites – Grosser Kurfürst Battery, formerly with three 170 millimeter guns, and Todt Battery, with four 380 mm guns. These covered the approaches to both Calais and Boulogne and they were protected by massive concrete blockhouses and other lesser defensive sites. One of the Todt Battery blockhouses now houses the Atlantic Wall Museum.

Units of the 3rd Canadian Infantry Division liberated the area in September 1944.

Post-World War II 
The cylindrical concrete lighthouse at Cap Gris-Nez dates from 1958. It is 31 meters (102 feet) high, and replaces an earlier structure destroyed in 1944.

The lighthouse and its accompanying radar station provide guidance to over 500 ships passing the cape every day.

See also
 Itius Portus
 Cross-Channel guns in the Second World War

References

External links

Landforms of the Pas-de-Calais
Gris Nez
Landforms of Hauts-de-France
Chalk landforms